Fu Tei is an area of Tuen Mun District in Hong Kong.

Features
 Fu Tai Estate
 Lingnan University
 Fu Tei Tsuen, a village that comprises the two hamlets of Fu Tei Ha Tsuen and Fu Tei Sheung Tsuen
 Lam Tei Reservoir
 Fung Tei stop

Education
Fu Tei is in Primary One Admission (POA) School Net 71. Within the school net are multiple aided schools (operated independently but funded with government money); no government schools are in the school net.

References

Fu Tei